Mitchells Roberton is a law firm located on George Square in the city center of Glasgow, Scotland. It is the oldest law firm in Glasgow, dating back to the 18th century. Operating on an egalitarian basis.

Areas of law covered 

 Private client practice
 Tax
 Trusts and estates
 Family law
 Commercial property
 Security
 Debt Recovery
 Litigation
 Pensions
 General commercial advice
 Financial planning advice
 Estate agency
 Residencial Conveyancing

Staff

Partners 

 Donald Reid
 Ronald Inglis
 Ian Ferguson
 Morag Inglis
 Ross Leatham
 Joel Conn
 Paul Neilly
 Neil MacKenzie

References

External links
 Mitchells Roberton official website

Law firms of Scotland
Companies based in Glasgow